David Serkin Ludwig (born 1974, Bucks County, Pennsylvania) is an American composer, teacher, and Dean of Music at The Juilliard School. His uncle was pianist Peter Serkin, his grandfather was the pianist Rudolf Serkin, and his great-grandfather was the violinist Adolf Busch. He holds positions and residencies with nearly two dozen orchestras and music festivals in the US and abroad. His choral work, The New Colossus, was performed at the 2013 presidential inauguration of Barack Obama. 

Ludwig has held residencies with Meet the Composer, the Isabella Stewart Gardner Museum, MacDowell and Yaddo, and the Marlboro Music School and has held residency and faculty positions at Yellowbarn, the Ravinia Festival Steans Young Artist Program, the Atlantic Music Festival, Curtis Institute Young Artist Program, Lake Champlain Chamber Music Festival, Lake George Music Festival, Mostly Modern Festival, Shanghai International Music Festival, and the Seoul National University Studio 20/21 Ensemble.

Ludwig has received commissions and notable performances from many of the most recognized artists, ensembles, and venues of our time, including the Philadelphia Orchestra, Pittsburgh Symphony, Minnesota Orchestra, National Symphony Orchestra, Carnegie Hall, Chamber Music Society of Lincoln Center, as well as Jonathan Biss, Jeremy Denk, Jennifer Koh, Jaime Laredo, David Shifrin, eighth blackbird, the Dover Quartet and Borromeo String Quartet, and the PRISM Quartet.

In 2022 Ludwig was awarded the Stoeger Prize from the Chamber Music Society of Lincoln Center, the largest of its kind for chamber music. He received the prestigious 2018 Pew Center for the Arts and Heritage Fellowship, as well as the First Music Award, and is a two-time recipient of the Independence Foundation Fellowship, a Theodore Presser Foundation Career
Grant, and awards from New MusicUSA, The American Composers Forum, the American Music Center, Detroit Chamber Winds, and the National Endowment for the Arts.

Ludwig joined the composition faculty at the Curtis Institute of Music as of the 2010-2011 academic year, and was the Artistic Director of the Curtis 20/21 Contemporary Music Ensemble and the Dean of Artistic Programs. He has also composed for films such as Cymbeline. After twenty years on the faculty of the Curtis Institute culminating as Artistic Advisor to the President and Chair of Composition, Ludwig was appointed Dean and Director of Music at The Juilliard School in May 2021

Education 

Ludwig attended Oberlin College for his undergraduate degree, originally intending to take a degree in art history, but eventually taking a music degree. His teachers included Richard Hoffmann. He spent one year studying at the University of Vienna. After that, he received his M.M. from the Manhattan School of Music. He completed additional post-graduate work at the Curtis Institute of Music with Richard Danielpour, Jennifer Higdon, and Ned Rorem, and at the Juilliard School with John Corigliano. He received his PhD from the University of Pennsylvania, where he was the George Crumb Fellow, with his "Sonata for Violin and Piano" as his dissertation.

Awards 

In 2022, Ludwig won the Chamber Music Society of Lincoln Center Stoeger Prize for outstanding contributions to Chamber Music. In 2016, Ludwig won the A.I. du Pont Award for his "significant contribution to contemporary classical music" and in 2018 received the 2018 Pew Center for Arts & Heritage Fellowship in the Arts. Ludwig was a winner of the First Music Award, a two-time recipient of the Independence Foundation Fellowship, a Theodore Presser Foundation Career Grant, and awards from New Music USA, the American Composers Forum, the American Music Center, Detroit Chamber Winds, and the National Endowment for the Arts. Choral Arts Philadelphia honored Ludwig as a City Cultural Leader in 2009.

Personal life

Ludwig is married to violinist Bella Hristova.

Compositions
Source:

Orchestral 
 Les Adieux Concerto for Clarinet and Chamber Orchestra (2020)
 Bleeding Pines oratorio for chorus and orchestra (2020)
 Pangæa (2017) concerto for piano and strings
 Concerto for Violin and Orchestra (2015)
 Saturn Bells (2014) for solo violin and orchestra
 Pictures from the Floating World (2013) for solo bassoon and orchestra 
 Virtuosity (2013), Five Micro-Concertos for String Orchestra
 Seasons Lost (2012) for two solo violins and string orchestra
 Fanfare for Sam (2011) 
 La Follia (2011) for string orchestra
 Symphony No. 1 "Book of Hours" (2009) for solo soprano and orchestra
 Concerto for Violin, Cello and Orchestra (2008)
 Hanukkah Cantata for vocal soloists, SATB chorus, brass, and strings
 Concertino for solo violin and orchestra (2005)
 Concerto for Cello and Orchestra (2004)
 Radiance, serenade for oboe and strings (2003)
 NightVision (2001)

Chamber 
 Seven Circles (2019) for violin and clarinet
 Prima Variations (2019) for guitar and string trio
 Nigunim (2019) for flute, violin, and piano
 Paganiniana (2018) for solo violin, flute, clarinet, violin, cello, piano, and percussion
 Spiral Galaxy (2017) for violin, cello, and piano
 Three Pictures from the Floating World (2017) for bassoon, violin, viola, and cello
 Titania's Dream (2015) for piano trio
 Rule of Three (2015) for two violins and viola
 with the lilies and the song and the stars (2014) for Dizi (or alto flute), string quartet, and piano
 Pale Blue Dot (2014) for string quartet
 Aria Fantasy (2013) for piano quartet
 Kantigas (2013) for Arabic violin, guitar, and Arabic percussion
 Josquin Microludes (2012) for saxophone quartet
 Piccola Musica Notturna (2011) for English horn, harp, string quartet
 Three Yiddish Dances (2010) for piano trio
 Sonata for Flute and Piano No. 2 "Canzoniere" (2010) for flute and piano
 Flowers in the Desert (2009) for clarinet, viola, and piano
 From the Rubayaat of Omar Khayyam (2008) for mezzo-soprano and chamber ensemble
 Aigaios (2007) for string quartet
 A Modern Psalm (2007) for jazz trio: piano, bass, drum set
 Lamentations (2006) for clarinet, harp, bass, and percussion
 Divertimento (2006) for violin, viola, cello, bass, piano
 Haiku Catharsis (2004) for Pierrot ensemble
 Four Japanese Folk Songs (2003) for euphonium and string quartet
 The Catherine Wheel (2002) for oboe quartet
 April Variations (2002) for violin, guitar, and cello
 Autumn Variations (2002) for violin, guitar, cello
 Dances of Light (2000) for string trio
 Poems from Antiquity (1998) for clarinet and string quartet

Vocal 
 Songs from the Spirit of Turpentine (2019) for baritone and piano
 Songs from the Bleeding Pines (2016) for soprano and piano
 O Clavis David (2015) for soprano and SATB choir
 Still Life (2013) soprano and piano
 Four Ladino Folk Songs (2012) for SATB choir
 Our Long War (2011) for soprano, violin, and piano
 Ewigkeit (2011) for baritone and chamber ensemble
 From the Rubayaat of Omar Khayyam (2008) for mezzo-soprano and chamber ensemble
 Hannukah Cantata (2007) for SATB choir + soloists, cornetto, 3 sackbuts, organ, and baroque strings
 Four Hanukkah Songs (2007) for SATB choir and piano
 Kaddish (2006)
 The Choir (2004) for SATB choir
 Whitman Songs (2002) for baritone and piano
 The New Colussus (2002) for SATB choir
 Ave Maria (2000) for SSAA
 Things to Do in a Park (2000) for children's choir & string quartet

Solo 

 All The Rage (2020) for solo violin

 Moto Perpetuo (2016) for solo violin
 Swan Song (2013) for violin and piano
 Five Ladino Songs (2012) for violin
 Lunaire Variations (2012) for piano
 Five Bagatelles (2011) for piano 
 Sonata for Flute and Piano No. 2 "Canzoniere" (2010)
 Density 15.1 (2010) for solo tenor saxophone
 Scenes from Childhood (2009) for cello and piano
 Six Haikus (2008) for horn and piano
 Dante Microludes (2008) for cello
 Three Chansons (2007) for cello and piano
 Pleiades (2005) for oboe and piano
 Three Portraits of Isabella (2003) for solo piano
 Sonata No. 1 for Flute and Piano (2002)

Large ensemble 
 The Anchoress (2018) for soprano, saxophone quartet, Renaissance winds, and percussion 
 Missa Brevis (2008) for wind ensemble

References

External links
 Official David Ludwig website
 Curtis Institute of Music faculty page on David Ludwig
 University of Pennsylvania, Department of Music, 'Penn Ph.D.s in Composition'
 Instant Encore
 Vermont Symphony Orchestra interview with Ludwig
 The Bulletin Newspaper
 world of music blog, 29 August 2009

American male classical composers
American classical composers
Oberlin College alumni
Manhattan School of Music alumni
Curtis Institute of Music alumni
University of Pennsylvania alumni
20th-century classical composers
21st-century classical composers
Living people
1974 births
People from Bucks County, Pennsylvania
21st-century American composers
20th-century American composers
Classical musicians from Pennsylvania
20th-century American male musicians
21st-century American male musicians
Curtis Institute of Music faculty